Matama is a district of the Limón canton, in the Limón province of Costa Rica.

History 
Matama was created on 10 August 1992 by Decreto Ejecutivo 21515-G.

Geography 
Matama has an area of  km2 and an elevation of  metres.

Locations
Poblados: Aguas Zarcas, Asunción, Bananito Norte, Bearesem, Beverley, Calle Tranvía, Castillo Nuevo, Dondonia, Filadelfia Norte, Filadelfia Sur, Kent, María Luisa, Mountain Cow, Paraíso, Polonia, Quitaría, Río Banano, San Cecilio, Tigre, Trébol, Westfalia

Demographics 

For the 2011 census, Matama had a population of  inhabitants.

Transportation

Road transportation 
The district is covered by the following road routes:
 National Route 36
 National Route 241
 National Route 802

References 

Districts of Limón Province
Populated places in Limón Province